Kronos  (a.k.a. Kronos, Destroyer of the Universe or Kronos, Ravager of Planets) is a 1957 American black-and-white science fiction film from Regal Films, a division of 20th Century-Fox. It was produced by Irving Block, Louis DeWitt, Kurt Neumann, and Jack Rabin, directed by Kurt Neumann, and stars Jeff Morrow and Barbara Lawrence. Kronos was distributed as a double feature with She Devil.

Since the film's release, it has been widely praised for its above-average storyline and its farsighted portrayal of the consequences of over-consumption of both natural and man-made resources; it has achieved minor cult status as a result.

Plot
A huge, blinking flying object from deep space emits a glowing ball of electrical energy, which races to Earth. It intercepts a man driving his pickup along an isolated road in the American Southwest desert late at night. It takes over the man's mind. directing him to LabCentral, a U.S. research facility, where a pair of scientists have been tracking the flying object, thinking it to be an asteroid.

The possessed man knocks out LabCentral's security guard, then proceeds into the main building where the entity leaves the pickup driver and enters the mind of Dr. Hubbell Eliot, the LabCentral chief. Meanwhile, in a research lab below, astrophysicist Dr. Leslie Gaskell and his computer science associate, Dr. Arnold Culver, have been tracking the flying object. They realize that it is not only headed toward Earth but is moving  under intelligent guidance. They order three nuclear missiles fired, but they fail to destroy the object, which dives into the Pacific Ocean off the coast of Mexico.

The two scientists, along with Vera Hunter, LabCentral's staff photographer and Gaskell's girlfriend, rush to Mexico. After their arrival, they see an enormous dome, glowing and steaming, appear on the ocean horizon. The next morning, on the beach outside their room, they find that a very tall machine has appeared; its four-legged body has two mobile antennae.

They use a small helicopter to land atop the machine, glimpsing its complex inner workings before being forced to leave and fly back to LabCentral when the machine begins to move. The possessed Dr. Eliot, using lists of power stations and atom-bomb arsenals around the world, telepathically directs the machine. Now named Kronos by the news media, it methodically attacks power plants in Mexico, draining all their energy. In doing so, Kronos grows larger, consuming more and more power as it moves from one power source to the next. Four Mexican Air Force fighter planes attack, but the ever-growing alien machine easily destroys them and continues on its rampage.

Meanwhile, when Kronos is absorbing energy, Eliot is momentarily freed from the influence of the energy force controlling him. Eliot tells his returned colleagues that Kronos is an energy accumulator, sent by an alien race that has exhausted its own natural resources; they have sent their giant machine to drain all the Earth's available power and then return it to their dying world.

On Eliot's recommendation, the United States Air Force sends a B-47 bomber to drop an atomic bomb on Kronos. Gaskell warns the Air Force general in charge that an atomic explosion will simply supply the alien machine with more massive amounts of energy. The general attempts to abort the mission, but Kronos, aware of the plan by way of Dr. Eliot's mind, magnetically draws the jet to crash into it, absorbing the bomb's nuclear blast. The alien machine, now grown to an immense size, appears unstoppable, harvesting all forms of energy at will.

In another uncontrolled moment, Dr. Eliot locks himself in an hermetically sealed room and smashes the only electronic keypad for the door; he and the energy force which has possessed him expire. As Kronos draws near Los Angeles, Gaskell realizes that reversing the machine's polarity will force it to feed upon itself, until it is destroyed in a gigantic implosion. Gaskell, Culver, and Vera convince the Air Force to bombard Kronos with nuclear ions, which will cause the polarity to reverse; the experiment works, and Kronos is completely obliterated in the resulting implosion.

Cast

 Jeff Morrow as Dr. Leslie Gaskell
 Barbara Lawrence as Vera Hunter
 George O'Hanlon as Dr. Arnold Culver
 John Emery as Dr. Hubbell Eliot
 Morris Ankrum as Dr. Albert Stern
 Kenneth Alton as The Pickup Driver (Script name: McCrary)
 Jose Gonzales-Gonzales as Manuel Ramirez
 John Halloran as Lab Central Security Guard
 John Parrish as Gen. Perry
 Marjorie Stapp as The Nurse
 Robert Shayne as Air Force General
 Rosa Turich as Senora Ramirez
 Don Eitner as USAF Meteorology Sergeant
 Ron Kennedy as USAF Control Tower Sergeant
 Gordon Mills as A Sergeant
 Richard Harrison as A Pilot

Production
Kronos was filmed in a little more than two weeks (mid-January to late January 1957) in California; special effects were created by Jack Rabin, Irving Block, and Louis DeWitt.

The idea of an alien machine absorbing energy is similar to the giant alien machine from the later (1966) Star Trek television episode "The Doomsday Machine" which destroys planets and uses them to fuel itself.
  
George O'Hanlon, who plays Dr. Arnold Culver in the film, had just finished his popular series of Joe McDoakes comedy shorts and would be later known as the voice of George Jetson in the popular cartoon series The Jetsons.

Reception

Critical response
When the film was first released in 1957, Variety gave the film a favorable review: "Kronos is a well-made, moderate budget science-fictioner which boasts quality special effects that would do credit to a much higher-budgeted film ... John Emery is convincing as the lab head forced by the outer-space intelligence to direct the monster. Barbara Lawrence is in strictly for distaff interest, but pretty".

Film critic Dennis Schwartz was disappointed in the film's screenplay and acting. He wrote, "German emigre to Hollywood, Kurt Neumann (Tarzan and the Amazons/Son of Ali Baba/She Devil), directs this b/w shot, dull, so-so sci-fi film, that's played straight-forward, is humorless and all the thespians are wooden. It's based on the story by Irving Block and the weak script is written by Lawrence Louis Goldman".

See also
 List of American films of 1957

References

Bibliography
 Warren, Bill. Keep Watching the Skies: American Science Fiction Films of the Fifties, 21st Century Edition. Jefferson, North Carolina: McFarland & Company, 2009, .

External links

 
 
 
 
 Kronos information site and DVD review by Glenn Erickson at Savant Review
 
 Original soundtrack CD of music from Kronos

1957 films
1950s science fiction films
20th Century Fox films
CinemaScope films
American science fiction films
Alien invasions in films
American black-and-white films
Films about scientists
Films directed by Kurt Neumann
Giant monster films
American robot films
Films scored by Paul Sawtell
1950s English-language films
1950s American films